Cyril Wilson Collins (May 7, 1889 – February 28, 1941) was a backup outfielder in Major League Baseball, playing mainly at left field for the Boston Braves in the  and  seasons.

A native of Pulaski, Tennessee, he attended Vanderbilt University. He was a member of both the football and baseball teams there. Edwin Pope's Football's Greatest Coaches reads "A lightning-swift backfield of Lew Hardage, Wilson Collins, Ammie Sikes, and Ray Morrison pushed Vandy through 1911 with only a 9-8 loss to Michigan." The Atlanta Constitution voted it the best backfield in the South.

During the First World War, Collins was the fullback for the 1917 Camp Gordon football team.

In a two-season career, Collins was a .263 hitter (10-for-38) with five runs and one RBI in 43 games. He did not hit have any extra-base hits. In 28 outfield appearances, he committed two errors in 27 chances for a collective .926 fielding percentage.

Collins died in Knoxville, Tennessee, at the age of 51.

References

External links

Baseball Almanac

1889 births
1941 deaths
Boston Braves players
Major League Baseball outfielders
Vanderbilt Commodores baseball players
Baseball players from Tennessee
Binghamton Bingoes players
Worcester Busters players
Fitchburg Burghers players
Vanderbilt Commodores football players
American football halfbacks
People from Pulaski, Tennessee
Baseball pitchers